The Cal State Bakersfield Roadrunners men's basketball represents California State University, Bakersfield in Bakersfield, California, United States. The team is currently led by head coach Rod Barnes and competes in the Big West Conference.

The Roadrunners joined NCAA Division I in 2007. During their time in NCAA Division II they participated in 21 NCAA Division II Tournaments. They advanced to the final four eight times and are three time national champions (1993, 1994, 1997). They won the Western Athletic Conference Tournament in 2016 earning their first bid to the NCAA Division I men's basketball tournament.

Postseason appearances

NCAA Division I Tournament results
The Roadrunners have appeared in the NCAA Division I Tournament one time. Their record is 0–1.

NCAA Division II Tournament results
The Roadrunners have appeared in the NCAA Division II Tournament 21 times. Their combined record is 41–20. They are three time NCAA Division II national champions (1993, 1994, 1997).

NIT results
The Roadrunners have appeared in one National Invitation Tournament (NIT). Their record is 3–1.

CIT results
The Roadrunners have appeared twice in the  CollegeInsider.com Postseason Tournament (CIT). Their combined record is 2–2.

References

External links